Archbishop Stanislaus Lo Kuang (1 January 1911 – 28 February 2004) served as bishop of Tainan from 1961 to 1966, when he was appointed archbishop of Taipei. In 1978, Lo became the president of Fu Jen Catholic University, and was succeeded by Gabriel Chen-Ying Ly.

He was born in Hengyang, China.

References

External links

聖神研究中心
在光中行走－羅光總主教百歲誕辰紀念展

1911 births
2004 deaths
Academic staff of Fu Jen Catholic University
Presidents of universities and colleges in Taiwan
People from Hengyang
Pontifical Urban University alumni
Taiwanese educators
20th-century Roman Catholic bishops in Taiwan